Paulo Afonso Evangelista Vieira, better known as Paulo Afonso, is a federal deputy and member of the PMDB of Santa Catarina. He was the governor of the state of Santa Catarina from 1995 to 1999, succeeding Antônio Carlos Konder Reis and being succeeded by Esperidião Amin Helou Filho.

External links
Câmara

Living people
Brazilian Democratic Movement politicians
Governors of Santa Catarina (state)
People from Santa Catarina (state)
Year of birth missing (living people)